Hagen is a small town in the commune of Steinfort, in western Luxembourg.  , the town has a population of 956.

Steinfort
Towns in Luxembourg